Multiocular O is a rare glyph variant of the Cyrillic letter O. This glyph variant can be found in a single 15th century manuscript, in the Old Church Slavonic phrase "" ("many-eyed seraphim"). It was documented by Yefim Karsky from a copy of the Book of Psalms from around 1429, now found in the collection of the Trinity Lavra of St. Sergius.

The character was proposed for inclusion into Unicode in 2007 and incorporated as character U+A66E in Unicode version 5.1 (2008). The representative glyph had seven eyes. However, in 2021, following a tweet highlighting the character, it came to linguist Michael Everson's attention that the character in the 1429 manuscript was actually made up of ten eyes. After a 2022 proposal to change the character to reflect this, it was updated later that year for Unicode 15.0 to have ten eyes.

See also 
 O (Cyrillic), О
 Monocular O, Ꙩ
 Binocular O, Ꙫ
 Double monocular O, Ꙭ
 Double O (Cyrillic), Ꚙ
 Crossed O, Ꚛ
 Cyrillic script in Unicode

References

O
Cyrillic letters
Language and mysticism
Eyes in culture
Angels in Christianity
Grammatical number